The Saatse Boot is a boot-shaped area of Russian territory of  that extends through the road number 178 between the Estonian villages of Lutepää and Sesniki (themselves between the larger settlement Värska and village of Saatse) in Setomaa Parish.

Background
The current Estonian–Russian border in Setomaa was established in 1944 when most of the territory of Estonian Petseri County was transferred to the Russian Soviet Federative Socialist Republic. During the Soviet era, it was merely an administrative border between two constituent republics of the Soviet Union. Estonia regained independence in 1991 and since then the same border (officially referred to as 'line of control' by Estonia) has been the international border between the two countries. The border is oddly shaped because the area was historically owned by a farm at the village of Gorodishche located  further east.

Värska-Saatse Road

The road between the settlements of Värska and Saatse goes through the Saatse Boot for approximately 1km. Estonian citizens in motor vehicles are permitted to pass through the Russian portion without presenting to border control or needing a visa, as long as they do not stop until they have re-entered Estonian territory. Should their vehicle break down and be forced to stop, drivers are advised to remain in their vehicle, contact the Saatse border station and await further instructions. Passing through on foot or exiting the vehicle is forbidden. Warning signs in Estonian, Russian, and English are posted along the road to remind people.

Despite the warning signs, however, people do on occasion violate the rules. On several occasions, tourists have been caught getting out of their cars within the Boot to take photos of the Russian border posts, not realising that in doing so they have already violated the rules. In 2017, according to the Estonian Police and Border Guard Board, ten violations were noted and one person was detained in the Boot.

Future
According to a yet-unratified new Estonian–Russian border treaty, the boot will be straightened out and the border oddity will disappear. The area of the boot will be transferred to Estonia in exchange for two patches of land in Värska and Meremäe Parishes. The treaty was signed in 2005 by the foreign ministers of Estonia and Russia, and again in 2014 after renegotiations. , the border treaty has not (yet) been executed, so the border oddity of the Saatse boot remains in place.

See also
 Enclave and exclave
 Estonia–Russia border
 Estonian–Russian territorial dispute

References

Estonia–Russia border
Setomaa Parish
Geography of Pskov Oblast
Transport in Estonia